The Libertarian Party of New Hampshire (LPNH) is the New Hampshire affiliate of the national Libertarian Party (LP). Active since its foundation in 1972, it is the third-largest political party in the state having had multiple members elected to the New Hampshire House of Representatives as well as being ballot-qualified multiple times.

The party became ballot-qualified after receiving over three percent of the popular vote in the 1990 gubernatorial election and maintained that status in the 1992 and 1994 elections. The party elected multiple members to the state house with the use of electoral fusion with the two major parties. The party's caucus in the state house was officially recognized from 1992 to 1995, and Representative Don Gorman served as the party's first state house leader. The party lost its ballot status after the 1996 gubernatorial election.

The party regained its ballot-qualified status after Max Abramson received enough support in the 2016 gubernatorial election. The party caucus in the state house was re-recognized in 2017, after Caleb Q. Dyer, Joseph Stallcop, and Brandon Phinney changed their political affiliations to Libertarian. However, the party lost its ballot-qualified status after the 2018 gubernatorial election and all of its members in the state house lost reelection in the 2018 state house elections.

Jiletta Jarvis, a former gubernatorial candidate, attempted to form a new affiliate in 2021, and claimed to have support from Joe Bishop-Henchman, the chair of the national Libertarian Party, but Bishop-Henchman denied supporting her. Bishop-Henchman resigned after an unsuccessful vote to disaffiliate the existing New Hampshire Libertarian Party and Jarvis handed control of party materials back to the existing affiliate. Since 2020 the party has been subjected to controversy due to its Twitter account.

History

1970s

Libertarians in New Hampshire started working with Nelson Pryor, a member of the New Hampshire House of Representatives, on legislation in 1973. The Libertarian Party of New Hampshire held its organizational caucus on August 4, 1974, in Nashua. The party was founded by Arthur W. Ketchen, but Ketchen would later become critical of the party and endorsed Meldrim Thomson Jr. for governor in 1978 instead of the Libertarian candidate. The party passed a resolution at its 1977 convention condemning Anita Bryant for her anti-gay rights activities.

In the 1974 elections Ketchen ran for a seat in the state house with the Democratic nomination while other members of the party ran as independent candidates. The party endorsed John H. O'Brien for the Republican nomination in the 1st congressional district during the 1974 election. The party endorsed Edward Hewson for the Republican nomination in the 1st congressional district during the 1976 election, but later ran O'Brien in the general election as a Libertarian and had the endorsement of the American Party.

1990s

The Libertarian Party gained qualified status after gaining more than three percent of the popular vote in the 1990 gubernatorial election. The party was ballot-qualified in New Hampshire from 1990 to 1996. During the 1992 presidential election the party held a presidential primary where Andre Marrou was the only option on the ballot and received 3,554 votes on the Libertarian ballot, 99 write-in votes in the Republican primary, and 67 write-in votes in the Democratic primary. During the 1992 presidential election the party held a presidential primary where Harry Browne won with 653 votes against Irwin Schiff's 336 votes, and 638 other write-in votes.

Calvin Warburton, who had served in the state house since 1978, changed his political affiliation from Republican to Libertarian and became a dues paying member on July 16, 1991. He stated that the Libertarians were the only one who stood for economic, personal, and social freedom and was critical of the Republicans for planning to create new taxes. On December 12, Representative Finlay Rothhaus changed his political affiliation from Republican to Libertarian. Rothhaus was critical of the Republicans for increasing government power, raising taxes, and increasing gun control. Representative Donald Roulston, who the party had attempted to recruit in 1989, but declined stating that he was "too much of an anarchist for you", changed his political affiliation from Republican to Libertarian in 1992. These three state representatives gave the Libertarian Party the largest amount of state legislators for a third party since the Socialist Party of America had four state legislators elected in Connecticut in 1938.

The party elected four members to the state legislature during the 1992 elections. These legislators were aided through the use of electoral fusion in 1992 and 1994, where they would also gain the nomination of a major party in addition to the Libertarian nomination. The party ran eighty-five candidates in the 1992 state house election and ninety-one candidates in the 1994 state house election. Representative Don Gorman was selected to serve as the party's leader in the state house through winning a coin toss after the caucus was divided two to two between Gorman and Warburton. The Libertarian Caucus was recognized by the state house due to having more than three members, but lost its recognition after membership decreased to two in 1995. Representative Jim McLarin resigned on February 9, 1995, leaving Gorman as the only Libertarian in the state house. Gorman lost reelection in the 1996 election.

Miriam Luce defeated Warbuton for the Libertarian gubernatorial nomination for the 1992 election and received 4.00% of the vote in the election. Warburton, Steve Winter, and Clarence G. Blevens ran for the Libertarian gubernatorial nomination for the 1994 election which Winter, who later served in the state house as a Republican, won and later received 4.40% in the election. Robert Kingsbury defeated Blevens and Rotthaus for the Libertarian gubernatorial nomination for the 1996 election, but only received 1.20% in the election causing the party to lose its ballot-qualified status.

Despite the fact that the party was qualified in the state and had members elected to the state legislature it was not allowed to have members serve as polling place officials as only the two largest parties could have members serve as polling place officials. The party sued against this law, but lost when Judge Bruce M. Selya ruled against them in Werme v. Merrill in 1996.

2000s

Representative Steve Vaillancourt was given the Libertarian nomination after he lost renomination in the Democratic primary and won reelection during the 2000 election. During the 2008 United States presidential election the party nominated George Phillies for president and Karen Kwiatkowski for vice-president at its state convention. Both people declined the nomination and the party had to hold another convention. However, Phillies still appeared on the general election ballot and received 531 compared to the national presidential ticket of Bob Barr and Wayne Allyn Root which received 2,217 votes.

In 2001, Jason Sorens, a PhD student at Yale University, wrote an essay calling for the mass migration of 20,000 libertarians to a single, low-population state where they would have the ability to have electoral power and create a libertarian society. On October 1, 2003, the organization selected New Hampshire as the state they would move to. Governor Craig Benson supported the movement stating "come on up, we'd love to have you". The Free State Project reached its goal of 20,000 members in 2016, and by then around 1,900 members had already moved to New Hampshire.

2010s

Max Abramson, a Republican member of the state house, switched to the Libertarian Party in May 2016, and ran for governor of New Hampshire in the 2016 gubernatorial election in which he received 4.31% of the popular vote giving the Libertarian Party qualified status in New Hampshire. Abramson later changed his political affiliation to Republican and won elected to the state house during the 2018 elections as a Republican, but later changed his political affiliation back to Libertarian on June 28, 2019.

In 2016, the five-member executive committee of the party voted to adopt a resolution calling for the secession of New Hampshire from the United States. Roger Paxton, the vice-chairman of the party, stated that “Recognizing that libertarianism is defined as self-ownership, and recognizing that both our federal and state founding documents make it clear that we have the right of peaceful secession. I’m pleased that the Libertarian Party of New Hampshire has resolved its support,”.

On February 9, 2017, Caleb Q. Dyer, a Republican member of the state house, changed his political affiliation to Libertarian. On May 10, Joseph Stallcop, a Democratic member of the state house, also switched his political affiliation to Libertarian bringing the Libertarian caucus to two members which entitled it to be recognized as a caucus and a room in the capitol. On June 27, the Libertarian Party announced at a press conference that Brandon Phinney, a Republican member of the state house, had changed his political affiliation to Libertarian. Stallcop later resigned from the state house on August 6, 2018.

The New Hampshire Secretary of State advised all town clerks that voters could register as members of the Libertarian Party on January 5, 2017, after the party had gained qualified status in the 2016 elections. During the 2018 elections both Libertarian gubernatorial candidates, Jiletta Jarvis and Aaron Day, alleged that Libertarians were being disenfranchised at polling places.

The party failed to receive 4% of the vote in the 2018 New Hampshire gubernatorial election causing it to lose its status in the state. Also both of the party's members in the state house lost reelection.

2020s

During the 2020 presidential election the party administered its own primary independent of the state, which was won by Vermin Supreme. Forty-four ballots were cast in the party's presidential primary.

The Mises Caucus, which is opposed to the Pragmatist Caucus which was in control of the Libertarian Party, planned a takeover of the Libertarian Party and had gained control over twenty-five of the state parties. In 2021, the party's Twitter account voiced support for ending child labor laws and repealing the Civil Rights Act of 1964 which were criticized by Gary Johnson, the party's former presidential nominee. The tweets were written by Jeremy Kauffman, a member of the New Hampshire Libertarian Party's state executive committee. Joe Bishop-Henchman, the chair of the national Libertarian Party, alleged that Kauffman wrote about black people having lower IQs and murdering transgender people.

On June 12, Jarvis formed a new Libertarian Party of New Hampshire, took control of the old party's digital assets, and attempted to regain control of the party's Twitter account. Jarvis claimed support from Bishop-Henchman based on a letter he wrote her on June 7 recognizing her as chair of the Libertarian Party of New Hampshire. Bishop-Henchman denied supporting Jarvis' actions, pointing to the letter having been written several days before the dispute. The Libertarian National Committee voted twelve to two, with three abstaining, against a motion supported by Bishop-Henchman to disaffiliate the Libertarian Party of New Hampshire. Bishop-Henchman and two members of the Libertarian National Committee resigned after the motion failed. Jarvis returned control of the party's website and other digital assets on June 17. Former vice-presidential candidate Spike Cohen and former Representative Justin Amash criticized Jarvis' attempted takeover.

The party continued to attract controversy for its tweets. On Martin Luther King Day 2022, the account claimed that black people are "in debt" to the United States because  they "receive special federal funding due to race and are first-in-line for every college and every job." The tweet also referenced a false claim made by former president Donald Trump that authorities denied white people access to the COVID-19 vaccine because of their race. The tweet was quickly deleted after it attracted criticism. On August 26, 2022, the fourth anniversary of U.S. Senator John McCain's death, the party's official Twitter account posted a picture of his daughter Meghan crying at his funeral with the caption "Happy Holidays." In a follow-up tweet, they advocated for "dancing on the graves of war criminals" like John McCain. Meghan McCain called the tweet "hideous" and said the photo represented the worst pain she'd ever been in. Amash agreed with her, calling the tweet "horrible" and "disgusting." The party's account responded by saying "Wait until you see what we tweet when the Clintons finally kick the bucket." The tweets prompted a reaction from sitting Governor of New Hampshire Chris Sununu, who said on CNN that they "should pretty much be the end of the Libertarian Party in New Hampshire". In August and September 2022, the party tweeted a number of antisemitic remarks including "6 million dollar minimum wage or you’re antisemitic." In a separate tweet, they compared Ukraine President Volodymyr Zelensky, who is Jewish, to Adolf Hitler.

Elected officials

Former
 Max Abramson – Member of the New Hampshire House of Representatives from the 20th Rockingham district (May 2016 – December 2016; June 2019 – 2020)
 Caleb Q. Dyer – Member of the New Hampshire House of Representatives from the 37th Hillsborough district (February 2017 – December 2018)
 Don Gorman – Member of the New Hampshire House of Representatives
 Brandon Phinney – Member of the New Hampshire House of Representatives from the 37th Hillsborough district (June 2017 – January 2019)
 Jim McLarin  – Member of the New Hampshire House of Representatives
 Finlay Rothhaus – Member of the New Hampshire House of Representatives
 Donald Roulston – Member of the New Hampshire House of Representatives
 Joseph Stallcop – Member of the New Hampshire House of Representatives from the 4th Cheshire district (May 2017 – August 2018)
 Calvin Warburton – Member of the New Hampshire House of Representatives
 Steve Vaillancourt – Member of the New Hampshire House of Representatives

Electoral performance

Presidential

Congressional

Gubernatorial

Voter registration

References

Notes

External links
 Official website

New Hampshire
Political parties in New Hampshire
Antisemitism in the United States